p-Coumaric acid glucoside is a hydroxycinnamic acid, an organic compound found in commercial breads containing flaxseed.

References

External links 
 p-Coumaric acid glucoside at www.phenol-explorer.eu

Hydroxycinnamic acid esters
Hydroxycinnamic acid glycosides
Phenol glucosides